Chalno  is a village in Gmina Topólka, Radziejów County, Kuyavian-Pomeranian Voivodeship, Poland.

References

Chalno